Reliance Securities Limited is a broking arm of Reliance Capital. It is one of India’s largest retail broking houses with over 1 million customers and a pan-India presence at more than 1,700 locations. The company is a corporate member of both the Bombay Stock Exchange (BSE) and the National Stock Exchange (NSE), and provides access to equities, derivatives, IPO's, mutual funds, bonds and corporate FDs.

See also
 List of private equity firms

References

External links
 Official Website

Financial services companies based in Mumbai
Companies listed on the Bombay Stock Exchange
Indian companies established in 2005
Brokerage firms
2005 establishments in Maharashtra
Financial services companies established in 2005
Companies listed on the National Stock Exchange of India